Unexpected is the fifth studio album by American singer Angie Stone. It was released on November 23, 2009, by Stax Records. The lead single, "I Ain't Hearin' U", premiered on Stone's website on October 5, 2009. A remixed version of "Free", featuring Young Nate, was released as the second and final single from the album.

Upon the album's UK release in February 2010, Stone told Pete Lewis of Blues & Soul: "Being as I've delivered four decent albums already, I felt it was safe to switch up and do something different this time. And musically overall I just wanted to have FUN! I wanted to do something that embodies a jam kinda feel, so that we could have some fun in concert and show people everything doesn't always have to be so serious."

Critical reception

Unexpected received a weighted score of 67 out of 100 from review aggregate website Metacritic, indicating "generally favorable reviews", based on nine reviews from music critics. In his review for Clash, Kevin Angel declared the album Stone's "strongest to date, as she delivers an LP that effortlessly combines the finest elements of neo soul with old-skool R&B. The album sees Stone lay down some of her most honest tunes to date." However, he criticized the inclusion of the song "Tell Me", a "song built on a techno groove feels out of place, and the use of auto-tune seems like a desperate attempt to give the album a more commercial appeal." Chris Roberts from BBC Music called the album "a likeable blend of soul and funk with judicious little dashes of rap," adding: "It’s a neo-soul record. A very good one, because that’s what she does, her passionate voice bringing abundant personality [...] The album’s unsurprising, and often unconscionably fine."

Allmusic editor Thom Jurek, giving the album three-and-a-half-out-of-five-star rating, found that with Unexpected Stone "delves deeper into funk and hip-hop than on her previous outings [...] These dozen tracks continue to reveal her versatility as a vocalist and recording artist; she can sing whatever it is she wants to with equal verve, authenticity, and flair. Despite the slicker and more diverse sounds on Unexpected, the soul quotient is high, even if this isn’t strictly a neo-soul album [...] Unexpected simply feels like a leap more than a step." Tyler Lewis from PopMatters noted that "it’s another great Angie Stone record that gives you plenty to savor [...] She is singular in her ability to be among the most stylistically diverse contemporary artists of our time, without being flashy about it. By now, Stone should know that we know this and love her for it. That she doesn’t, is perhaps, what’s really unexpected."

The Boston Globe journalist Siddhartha Mitter wrote that Unexpected offers "more musical variety than previous discs," adding that "Stone needn’t fret about keeping up with the Beyoncés; her church-infused, middle-class songs carry a proud legacy, and when she decries her 'haters', it rings false." Mitter felt that Stone shines most on the ballads, which she called "classic slow jams of the old school, a sadly fading form of which Stone is one of the great current purveyors." Critical with its misleading title, Simon Vozick-Levinson from Entertainment Weekly noted that "for the most part, Unexpected is one tasteful midtempo jam after another, with Stone’s honey-sweet harmonies unfolding over easygoing throwback vibes. That’s not necessarily a bad thing – the neo-soul approach has always suited Stone. But this is precisely what her old fans expect by now, and it’s unlikely to reel in many new ones."

Commercial performance
Unexpected debuted at number 133 on the US Billboard 200 and number 17 on the Top R&B/Hip-Hop Albums chart. A major drop from her previous effort The Art of Love & War, which had opened at number 11 on the Billboard 200, the album marked her lowest-charting entry yet. It was however ranked 93rd on Billboards Top R&B/Hip-Hop Albums year-end chart.

Track listing

Notes
  signifies a co-producer

Sample credits
 "Unexpected" and "Unexpected (Reprise)" contain elements from "Family Affair" by Sly and the Family Stone.
 "I Ain't Hearin' U" contains a sample of "What Are You Waiting for?" by Evelyn "Champagne" King, written by Willie Lester And Rodney Brown.
 ""Hey Mr. DJ" samples from "Here We Go" by Minnie Riperton, written by Arthur Phillips and Richard Rudolph.

Charts

Weekly charts

Year-end charts

References

2009 albums
Albums produced by Cozmo
Albums produced by Jazze Pha
Angie Stone albums
Stax Records albums